E470 may refer to:
 E-470, a limited-access tollway in Colorado
 E470a, the E number for the sodium, potassium or calcium salts of fatty acids
 E470b, the E number for magnesium salts of fatty acids